M Master Mathan is an Indian politician of the Bharatiya Janata Party and Badaga leader who served as a member of the Lok Sabha for two terms from 1998 to 1999 and 1999 to 2004.

References 

Living people
Lok Sabha members from Tamil Nadu
1932 births
People from Nilgiris district
India MPs 1998–1999
India MPs 1999–2004
Bharatiya Janata Party politicians from Tamil Nadu